Subrata Dutta (born 16 November 1975) is an actor who appears in Indian films. He is best known for his role in Bollywood films like Talaash, Tango Charlie, Zameen, The Shaukeens, Rakhcharitra, Bhootnath Returns and Bengali films Chaturanga, Bibar and Jor.

Early life and education 
Subrat Dutta was born in Bankura district of West Bengal. Eldest of three brothers, he completed his schooling from Bankura Christian Collegiate School and bachelor's degree from Bankura Sammilani College with major in Zoology.

Hailing from a non-filmy background Subrat Dutta had no planning to join films and he was preparing for his MBA, when suddenly an advertisement about a theatre workshop caught his attention. The 40 day long workshop organised by National School of Drama in Berhampore, West Bengal made him change his mind and he decided to join the school.
After completing his master's degree from National School of Drama he received a scholarship from Charles Wallace Trust, New Delhi and joined Central School of Speech and Drama, London.

He started his acting career as a theatre artist for NSD Repertory Company and played lead role in 35 plays before joining films.

Subrat Dutta has learnt dance from PranatI Sengupta and continued to take part in Tagore Dance Drama. He tried to learn Kathak but left after few months. He has also worked in amateur "Jatra".

Acting career 
He made silver screen debut with Hindi film Karvaan by Pankaj Butalia as the main protagonist in 1999. His first Bengali film was Uttara by Buddhadev Dasgupta where he played a small role of a Hindu militant.

In the beginning of his career he has worked for many television series too. His work was noticed in Bengali teleseries Shudhu Tomari Jonyo. He has worked in few episodes of the series "Tehreer…Munshi Premchand Ki” by Gulzar, based on stories of Munsi Premchand directed .  He was also featured in few episodes of the thriller series Kagaar on Sahara One. Later he returned to television once with Yash Raj Films series Powder in 2010.
After making his debut in both Bollywood and Bengali film, he went on to work in both the industries together. Bollywood films like 88 Antop Hill (2003), Zammen (2003) and Bengali film Swapner Feriwala (2002) were some of his early works.

Subrat Dutta’s claim to fame came with his portrayal of a common man Biresh in Bengali film Bibar directed by Subrata Sen, based on Samaresh Basu’s novel with the same name in the year 2006. He won Best Actor at the Osian’s Cinefan Festival of Asian and Arab Cinema His next Bengali ventures Jor (2008) and Chaturanga (2008) were completely different from Bibar, that proved his prowess as an actor. He played the main villain Indrajit in Swapan Saha’s commercial film Jor, remake of the super hit Telugu film Okkadu, whereas Suman Mukhopadhay’s period drama Chaturanga was based on Rabindranath Tagore’s novel. He later also starred in the Hindi remake of Okkadu, Tevar (2015) in a different role, allowing Manoj Bajpayee to play the main villain.

In 2009 he was awarded Best Actor at Cairo International Film Festival, Egypt for his portrayal of the main protagonist Madholal in the film Madholal Keep Walking by Jai Tank. The film received positive reviews from critics and Subrat Dutta’s character was highly praised that gave him lead roles in many commercial and independent films in later years.

His next venture was Ram Gopal Varma’s magnum opus, Rakhcharitra part I and &II (2010), where he was noticed for playing the character of AK in Hindi & Telugu simultaneously. In the same year he appeared in Bengali films Achin Pakhi and Antim Shash Sundar opposite Indrani Haldar. He next worked in Talaash(2012), Bengali project Koyekti Meyer Golpo (2012), and some independent Hindi films like Oass (2012), Kaphal (2012) and Baromas (2013), before bagging the role of engineer ghost in super hit film Bhootnath Returns (2014).
He next appeared as the main villain Bheera in Roar: Tigers of the Sundarbans (2014) based on tiger poaching in Sundarbans and film director Basu in Akshay Kumar starrer Bollywood film TheShaukeens (2014). In both the films his role received critical acclaim. He also appeared in films like Bumper Draw (2015), Charlie Kay Chakkar Mein (2015) and played lead role as ATS Chief in Sameer (2017) and Gandhian Divakar in Humne Gandhi Ko Mar Diya (2018). His next release was multilimgual III Smoking Barrels where he played the character of a Bangladeshi refugee earned him immense applause from pan Indian audience and critics. His character Mukhtar turns the victim of illegal Elephant poaching where his every move and actions got praised by the critics.

Subrat Dutta was part of Bengali popular series Byomkesh also. He played a noticeable role in Har Har Byomkesh in 2015. Later he played Ajit for Byomkesh series of popular Bengali online channel Hoichoi. He has played the lead character in the emotional drama Bhairavi which was released exclusively on Muvizz.com in 2016.
Apart from Bollywood and Bengali films he has also appeared in Marathi film Lalbaugchi Rani (2016), Bhojpuri films Tujhse Laagi Lagan, Pistol Ego Prem Kahani and American production English language film Behind the Trees.

Subrat Dutta has acted in more than 45 films. Most of his films like Uttara, Kaphal: The Wild Berries, Chaturanga, Bibar, Madholal Keep Walking were shown in prestigious National & International Festivals & also won couple of prestigious National and International awards. He has often been referred 'chameleon' as he changed his appearance for every film and experimented with his look for each character he played.

Aasma by Sudipto Sen, T for Tajmahal by Kireet Khurana, Bengali film Sitara opposite Raima Sen and Brishti tomake Dilam opposite Jaya Ahsan are some of his upcoming films.

Subrat Dutta appears in TV and web commercials regularly. Some of his notable commercials are Parle G, Wonder cement, Aircel IPL Commercial, OLX. and Google Paise.

Personal life 
Subrat Dutta is a Yoga expert and practitioner. He was married to theatre director Robijita Gogoii from 2006 to 2018 whom he met in National School of Drama. After long year of courtship they got married on 29 August 2006. Together they have a daughter named Aatreyi born on 8 June 2010.His other name subrata dutta but known as subrat dutta.

.

Filmography

Film

Upcoming Films

TV series

Web series

He has played the character of a broker in Netflix Original Series Selection Day. He has also appeared as Ajit in Hoichoi TV’s popular show Byomkesh for three seasons from 2017-2018.

Awards
 Best Actor: Cairo International Film Festival, Egypt, 2009 
 Best Actor: at Osian's-Cinefan, New Delhi, 2006
Best Actor: Dehradun International Film Festival, 2021 (Josef – Born in Grace)
Best Actor: Manikarnika Film Festival, 2022 (Josef – Born in Grace)

References

External links
 

Living people
Indian male film actors
Male actors in Hindi cinema
1975 births